The 2013–14 Ole Miss Rebels men's basketball team will represent the University of Mississippi in the 2013–14 college basketball season. The team's head coach is Andy Kennedy, in his eighth season at Ole Miss. The team plays their home games at the Tad Smith Coliseum in Oxford, Mississippi as a member of the Southeastern Conference.

Before the season

Departures

Recruits

Season

Preseason
Ole Miss made headlines on July 10, 2013, when the team indefinitely suspended their leading scorer from 2012 to 2013, the enigmatic Marshall Henderson. Henderson was the 2013 SEC Tournament MVP and averaged 20.1 points per game in 2012–13, but had well-documented issues with partying, drugs, and other general inappropriate behavior. In August 2013, Henderson was cleared to return to class by Ole Miss.

Head coach Andy Kennedy announced the Rebels' full season schedule on August 20, 2013. Key non-conference games included a trip to the Barclays Center Classic, as well as games against 2013 NCAA Tournament participants Kansas State, Oregon and Middle Tennessee. Conference play was highlighted by a home-and-home series with Kentucky, as well as visits to Tad Smith Coliseum from Florida, LSU, and Alabama.

The Rebels opened the season with one exhibition game against USC-Aiken on November 1. Ole Miss struggled their way to a 5-point win in overtime, led by Derrick Millinghaus who had 15 points.

November
Ole Miss opened the regular season on November 8 at home against Troy. Led by 28 points by Jarvis Summers, the Rebels brought a 13-point lead into halftime and coasted to a 69–54 victory.

Roster

Schedule and results

|-
!colspan=9 style="background:#; color:white;"| Exhibition

|-
!colspan=9 style="background:#; color:white;"| Non-conference games

|-
!colspan=9 style="background:#; color:white;"| Conference games

|-
!colspan=9 style="background:#; color:white;"| SEC tournament

See also
2013–14 Ole Miss Rebels women's basketball team

References

Ole Miss Rebels men's basketball seasons
Ole Miss
Ole Miss Rebels men's basketball team
Ole Miss Rebels men's basketball team